George Liberace (July 31, 1911 – October 16, 1983) was an American musician and television performer.

Biography 
Born in Menasha, Wisconsin on July 31, 1911, George Liberace was the elder brother and business partner of famed entertainer Liberace. He appeared regularly on his brother's syndicated television show in the 1950s as violin accompanist and orchestral arranger. On occasions when he did not appear, Liberace would often say his catchphrase "I wish my brother George was here".

In the 1960s and 1970s, his name was licensed to George Liberace Songsmiths, Inc., a mail-order music publishing operation of somewhat dubious integrity. On October 5, 1974, a new independent UHF television station, KMUV-TV Channel 31, signed on with George Liberace who worked at the station as the general manager and on-the-air host.  The new station played non-stop movies.  However, on May 1, 1976, KMUV abandoned its all-movie format and largely began to air Spanish-language programming, along with some English-language religious programs. George Liberace resigned his managerial job with KMUV at about this time.

In 1979, he retired from conducting and performing the violin onstage and devoted most of his time to managing the Liberace Museum in Las Vegas, even occasionally giving tours to visitors himself in showing the cars, pianos and costumes and other artifacts owned by his brother. From 1967 until his death, George Liberace was married to Eudora Albrecht. He lived most of his life in Palm Springs, California, in a house owned by his brother.

George Liberace died of leukemia at a hospital in Las Vegas, Nevada, on October 16, 1983, at age 72, and was interred in Forest Lawn Memorial Park in the Hollywood Hills.

References

External links 

 
 
 George Liberace on Song-Poems

1911 births
1983 deaths
20th-century American male musicians
20th-century American violinists
American male violinists
Burials at Forest Lawn Memorial Park (Hollywood Hills)
Deaths from cancer in Nevada
Deaths from leukemia
Imperial Records artists
Musicians from Palm Springs, California
Musicians from Wisconsin
People from Menasha, Wisconsin